The Seven Great Houses of Iran, also known as the seven Parthian clans, were seven feudal aristocracies of Parthian origin, who were allied with the Sasanian court. The Parthian clans all claimed ancestry from Achaemenid Persians.

The seven Great Houses of Iran had played an active role in Iranian politics since the days of the Arsacid Empire, which they continued to do under their successors, the Sasanians. Only two of the seven – the House of Suren and the House of Karen – however, are actually attested in sources date-able to the Parthian period. The seven houses claimed to have been confirmed as lords in Iran by the legendary Kayanian king Vishtaspa. "It may be that [...] members of them made up their own genealogies in order to emphasize the antiquity of their families." During Sasanian times, the seven feudal houses played a significant role at the Sasanian court. Bahram Chobin, a famed military commander of Hormizd IV (r. 579–590), was from the House of Mihran.

The seven houses with their respective main fiefs and ruling-family seats were:
the House of Ispahbudhan, of Tabaristan and Gurgan
the House of Varaz, of Eastern Khorasan
the House of Karen, of Nahavand
the House of Mihran, of Ray
the House of Spandiyadh, of Ray
the House of Zik, of Adurbadagan
the House of Suren, of Sakastan

See also
Seven Achaemenid clans
Sasanian government
Dabuyid dynasty
Padusbanids
Ispahbads of Gilan
 Bavand dynasty
 Qarinvand dynasty
 Chosroid dynasty

References

Sources
.
.
.

Clans